A control commission is an independent regulatory body.  Control commissions are most often found in regulated industries and political organisations.  They typically have full authority to operate within the regulations that establish them.

 In the aftermath of the Second World War, the defeated Axis countries were administered by Allied Control Commissions consisting of representatives of the major Allied Powers.  Compare also the Military Inter-Allied Commission of Control established after World War I.
 In regulated industries, including gaming, alcohol and monopolies, control commissions may define and implement regulations set by legislatures.  They can be involved in the allocation of licenses and the defining of operating requirements for market participants.
 In political organisations, control commissions may be committees that are independent of the leadership of the organisation who ensure the correct functioning of the organisation. Membership of commissions typically excludes members of the presiding body and their staff, or includes one member of the presiding body.  Commission duties might include the oversight of disciplinary proceedings, the investigation of alleged irregularities, the oversight of financial management and the interpretation of rules and statutes.

External links 

These are some examples of control commissions:
 Manitoba Gaming Control Commission
 European Young Socialists, Control Commission
 Socialist Action (US) Constitution includes an outline of its Control Commission
 Socialist Party (Australia) Constitution  includes an outline of its Control Commission

Government institutions